= Icaño, Catamarca =

Coordinates: 28°53′S 65°19′W

Icaño (Catamarca)
- Municipality and village
- Interactive map of Icaño (Catamarca)
- Country: Argentina
- Province: Catamarca Province
- Time zone: UTC−3 (ART)

Icaño (Catamarca) is a village and municipality in Catamarca Province in northwestern Argentina.
